Spencer Mawhinney (born May 30, 1977) is a Canadian curler from Saint John, New Brunswick. He currently plays second on Team Jason Roach.

Career
Mawhinney made the playoffs at the 2009 Alexander Keith's Tankard as lead for Charlie Sullivan. They lost in the semifinal to Rick Perron. He lost in the semifinal in 2011 as well, as lead for Paul Dobson.

In 2017, Mawhinney and his rink of Sullivan, Dobson and Mark Dobson made the final of the 2017 Pepsi Tankard. They had finished 4–3 in the round robin and defeated James Grattan in the semifinal. They took control of the game in the second end by stealing three after Mike Kennedy missed his last shot. The game was tied 4–4 in the ninth before Team Sullivan gave up a steal of three, ultimately losing the match 7–5. Mawhinney was invited to be Team Kennedy's fifth at the 2017 Tim Hortons Brier where he played in one game and the team finished with a 1–10 record. Mawhinney curled 96% in the game he played against Team Canada's Kevin Koe.

Teams

References

External links

Curlers from New Brunswick
Living people
Sportspeople from Saint John, New Brunswick
1977 births
Canadian male curlers